Edward James Roye (February 3, 1815 – February 11, 1872) served as the fifth president of Liberia from 1870 to his overthrow in 1871 and subsequent death. He had previously served as the fourth Chief Justice of Liberia from 1865 until 1868. He was the first member of Liberia's True Whig Party to serve as president.

Early life 
Born in 1815 in Newark, Ohio, Roye was a descendant of the Igbo people of present-day Nigeria.

Emigration to Liberia
In 1846, attracted by the American Colonization Society's promotion of the relocation of African Americans to the colony of Liberia in West Africa, Roye emigrated to the colony with his family at the age of 31. There he set up business as a merchant. The next year, the colony gained independence. Within three years of his arrival, Roye became active in Liberian politics, serving as a representative and speaker (1849-1850) of the Liberian House of Representatives, and as chief justice of the Supreme Court of Liberia. He was also the Secretary of the Treasury.

Presidency (1870-71)
Roye was inaugurated as President of Liberia on January 3, 1870. In the decades after 1868, escalating economic difficulties weakened the state's dominance over the coastal indigenous tribal peoples. Conditions worsened, the cost of imports was far greater than the income generated by exports of its commodity crops of coffee, rice, palm oil, sugarcane, and timber. Liberia tried desperately to modernize its largely agricultural economy.

Financial problems
In 1871, Roye tasked the speaker of the House of Representatives, William Spencer Anderson, with negotiating a new loan from British financiers. Anderson secured $500,000 under strict terms from the British consul-general, David Chinery, but was heavily criticised and eventually arrested. Anderson was apparently tried the following year for his part in securing the loan. He was found not guilty, but he was shot to death while leaving the courthouse.

End of presidency 
Roye was removed from the presidency on October 26, 1871, in what some allies called a coup d'état. The circumstances surrounding his removal from office, however, remain murky and highly partisan. What is known is that he was jailed for several months following his ouster and soon died under equally mysterious circumstances. His unpopular loans with Britain as well as fears from the Republican Party that he was planning to cancel the upcoming presidential election were among the reasons for his forced removal.

Death 
No specific historical record is available about the date and circumstances of Roye's death. Varying accounts indicate that he was killed on February 11 or February 12, 1872. Another account suggests that he drowned on February 12, 1872, while trying to reach a British ship in Monrovia harbor.

The portrait of President Roye in the gallery of the Presidential Mansion in Monrovia notes his date of death as February 11, 1872.

See also 
 History of Liberia
 List of unsolved deaths

References

Further reading 
 see History of Liberia, further reading

External links 
 Brief biographical sketch of Edward James Roye along with a portrait
 see also History of Liberia, external links

1815 births
1872 deaths
American expatriates in Liberia
Americo-Liberians of Igbo descent
Chief justices of Liberia
Igbo politicians
Ohio University alumni
Politicians from Newark, Ohio
Presidents of Liberia
Speakers of the House of Representatives of Liberia
Finance Ministers of Liberia
True Whig Party politicians
Unsolved deaths
19th-century Liberian politicians
19th-century Liberian judges